Urraca Fernández (died 1007) was queen of León and Navarre as the wife of two kings of León and one king of Navarre between 951 and 994. She acted as regent for her son Gonzalo in the County of Aragon in circa 996-997, and served as co-regent of the Kingdom of Navarre, along with her daughter-in-law Jimena Fernández and the bishops of Navarre, during the minor regency of her grandson Sancho III in circa 1004-1010.

Life
She was infanta of Castile and daughter of Count Fernán González and queen Sancha Sánchez of Pamplona. 

She was first married by her father to Ordoño III of León in 951. By him she had one child:
Bermudo II of León, whose maternity is subject to scholarly debate

In 958, after Ordoño's death, she was remarried to Ordoño IV. He died in 960.

Her third and most important marriage was contracted in 962 to Sancho II of Pamplona. Both Sancho and Urraca were grandchildren of Sancho I of Pamplona. With Sancho, she had several children:
García Sánchez II of Pamplona
Ramiro (died 992) 
Gonzalo, who ruled the County of Aragon with Urraca as regent
Urraca Sanchez, nicknamed "the Basque", adopted the Arabic name Abda after being given to Almanzor Ruler of Al-Andalus by her father Sancho II of Pamplona.  Urraca and Almanzor had a single son, named Abd al-Rahman Sanchuelo that became chief minister of Hisham II, Caliph of Córdoba.

Notes

1007 deaths
Navarrese royal consorts
Remarried royal consorts
Leonese queen consorts
Galician queens consort
10th-century women rulers
Urraca
House of Lara
Year of birth unknown
Burials at the Monastery of San Juan de la Peña
10th-century people from the Kingdom of León
10th-century Spanish women
10th-century people from the Kingdom of Pamplona
11th-century women rulers
Queen mothers